Seo In-guk (born October 23, 1987) is a South Korean singer-songwriter and actor. He launched his singing career after winning the talent reality show Superstar K in 2009, and made his acting breakthrough in Reply 1997 (2012). Since then, he has starred in television series Master's Sun (2013), High School King of Savvy (2014), Hello Monster (2015), Squad 38 (2016), Shopping King Louie (2016), The Smile Has Left Your Eyes (2018), Doom At Your Service (2021), and Café Minamdang (2022).

Early life and education
Seo was born on October 23, 1987, in Ulsan, where he lived with his parents and younger sister. He grew up in relative poverty; his mother worked as a recyclables collector and his father as a welder. Seo trained as a ssireum wrestler, learnt boxing and mixed martial arts in school and is a Hapkido 2nd dan. He decided to become a singer at the age of ten, after being inspired by the Korean rock musician Kim Jung-min and watching him perform ''Sad Promise''. Seo performed at family gatherings and school events, and moved to Seoul alone at the age of 20 to pursue his dream of becoming a singer despite his father's objections. 

While studying Applied Music at Daebul University, Seo auditioned for various record agencies such as JYP Entertainment and DSP Media but to no success. After repeatedly being rejected and told to lose weight, he struggled with bulimia for a time.  

Seo later enrolled at Kyung Hee Cyber University, Department of Information and Communication. He also pursued Master's degrees in Performing Arts at Dongguk University and Practical Music (Composition) at Baekseok University.

Career

2009–2011: Superstar K and music releases
In 2009, Seo competed in the Mnet singing competition program Superstar K, winning the show's first season. On October 27, 2009, he released his debut extended play Calling, with the same-title lead single composed by Bang Si-hyuk topping multiple music sites on its release day. Seo signed with Jellyfish Entertainment in the same year and won the Male Newcomer of the Year Award at the 2009 Cyworld Digital Music Awards.

In May 2010, Seo released his first single album Just Beginning with the lead single "I Love U". Seo made a brief foray into acting for the single's music video, to which he described his first acting experience as "awkward", saying, "I felt my hands and feet shrivel." The album reached number seven on the Gaon Album Chart, while the single peaked at number two on the Gaon Digital Chart. A repackage edition of the album titled My Baby U was released three months later. Having lost over 33 pounds (15 kg) since his debut through exercise and strict diet control, Seo's changes in his physical appearance brought about rumors of plastic surgery.

In 2011, shifting his sound, Seo released the single ''Broken'' incorporating choreography into his performance, as well as summer dance track ''Shake It Up'' in which he penned the lyrics for. Despite a successful debut, Seo reportedly received the "cold shoulder" treatment from the three major Korean public networks, as he was a cable television star.

2012: Acting debut and Reply 1997 
In 2012, Seo was part of the cast of the jukebox musical Gwanghwamun Love Song and made his onscreen acting debut with a supporting role in KBS's Love Rain. According to Seo, his role in Love Rain came at a time when he was feeling anxious about the life of an entertainer, and fueled his desire for acting. He landed his first leading role later that year, in cable channel tvN's '90s nostalgic hit drama Reply 1997. Seo's portrayal of a teenage boy in unrequited love with his childhood best friend won praise from both audiences and critics. Yonhap News praised, "It's hard to believe he's a rookie, from acting in his eyes, to handling lines and expressing emotions". As part of the drama's soundtrack, Seo recorded two duets with co-star Jung Eun-ji. The first duet "All For You", a remake of the song by Cool, topped weekly and monthly music charts and became one of the best-selling singles of the year on the Gaon Digital Chart. The single also won the Best OST award at the Melon Music Awards and Mnet Asian Music Awards that year. Seo appeared in MBC's weekend drama The Sons (also known as Rascal Sons) in the same year, and also signed with Japanese agency Irving Entertainment.

2013–2015: Japanese debut, variety shows and return to acting

Seo joined the newly launched reality/variety show I Live Alone from January to June 2013.
He returned to the music scene in April 2013 with the single With Laughter or with Tears, the first soulful ballad from his discography. Several weeks later, the song was followed by his Japanese debut with the release of the single Fly Away.

In June 2013, he was cast in Master's Sun, a drama series written by the Hong sisters, playing a former soldier who served in the Zaytun Division who becomes the head of security for a shopping mall company. In October 2013, he starred in his first big-screen leading role in No Breathing, a coming-of-age film about two swimming rivals, alongside Lee Jong-suk and Kwon Yuri. He then played a dual role in Another Parting, a five-episode miniseries about a man and a woman who meet in the final moment of their lives and spend one special day together. 

In 2014, Seo released his first Japanese album titled Everlasting, which comprises his previously released singles “Fly Away” and “We Can Dance Tonight”. The album also features a new track titled “Everlasting Love” with a total of 12 tracks. The album debuted at number nine on the Oricon Daily Chart. Seo later won the Best 3 New Artists (Asia) award at the Japan Gold Disc Awards.

Following the cancellation of action noir film Wild Dog which would have been Seo's second big-screen appearance, Seo headlined cable romantic comedy series High School King of Savvy in which he played a high school student and star hockey player who leads a double life when he's forced to take on his elder brother's job as an executive at an IT company. Later that year, Seo starred in his first period drama The King's Face, playing illegitimate crown prince Gwanghae, who becomes his father King Seonjo's rival in politics and love.

In 2015, Seo joined the cast of SBS variety show Law of the Jungle from March to May, for the Indochina season. He was then cast as a genius profiler in the police procedural/romance series Hello Monster which premiered in June 2015 on KBS2.

2016–present: Acclaim
In 2016 Seo joined Law of the Jungle for the second time for the show's Mongolia season. He also starred in OCN's workplace drama Squad 38, playing a professional swindler. Seo called the role a turning point in his acting career, and he received favourable press reviews for his ease of transformation into multiple character personas. The drama became the highest rated drama for OCN, and Seo won a special award for his role at the 11th Asian TV Drama Conference. He then took on the leading role in MBC's romantic comedy Shopping King Louie, playing the role of an amnesic chaebol heir with childlike innocence. For his performance, Seo was awarded the Excellence Award at the 2016 MBC Drama Awards.

On August 4, 2017, it was confirmed that Seo's contract with Jellyfish Entertainment had expired and that he would not be renewing his contract. On August 7, it was announced Seo had signed with BS Company.

In 2018, Seo starred in mystery melodrama The Smile Has Left Your Eyes, a remake of the 2002 Japanese television series Sora Kara Furu Ichioku no Hoshi. The drama reunited Seo with director Yoo Je-won, whom he had previously worked with in High School King of Savvy. Seo had initially contemplated taking up the role but decided to join the project following numerous discussions with director Yoo. Despite the drama's lackluster ratings, Seo's performance garnered positive press reviews. The Straits Times wrote, "It is a role that could easily slip into creepiness or smugness but Seo manages to pull off a delicate balancing act." Seo was set to star in film Hip Daddy but stepped down from the project in 2020 after production was put on hold.

In May 2021, Seo made his small-screen return with fantasy romance drama Doom at Your Service as the personification of destruction. In the same month, he also returned to the big screen after eight years in Yoo Ha's comedy-crime film Pipeline as a drilling expert involved in an oil heist. Director Yoo said about Seo's casting, "I was fascinated the first time I saw him. [...] His face showed so much different potential." In December 2021, Seo signed a singer contract with AER Music.

On June 14, 2022, Seo released his new single album Love&Love and its lead single "My Love", featuring Ravi, his first release after five years. A teaser for the music video was released on June 9, 2022 on YouTube. The same year, he played a profiler-turned-shaman in KBS2 drama Café Minamdang, alongside Oh Yeon-seo. On June 14, it was announced that Seo 'Heart & Love' fan meeting will be held at Yes24 Live Hall on July 30.On December 6, 2022, Seo will release the single "Fallen", the first single released in six months. Seo then starred in Kim Hong-sun's action thriller film Project Wolf Hunting as a criminal with Jang Dong-yoon, alongside Choi Gwi-hwa and Sung Dong-il. 

On February 8, 2023, Seo was confirmed to star in the upcoming TVING original series Death's Game.

Personal life

Military duty exemption
In February 2017, it was announced that Seo received his official military enlistment date, set to take place on March 28. He had previously pushed back his enlistment twice, starting in March 2015 and he gave his condition as a reason. Neither the media nor his management company states he did or didn't receive treatment though. But he'd passed a physical to enlist. It was reported he would enter his two-year military service quietly, without media coverage. Seo opted, instead, to release a music video for his self-composed song, "Better Together", written to his fans. The video was released on YouTube on March 26, 2017. However, due to a fractured ankle, Seo was excused from mandatory military service just four days after entering the military and was scheduled for a medical re-examination to determine if he was fit to return to the military. His agency released the results of his medical re-examination, revealing Seo was diagnosed with Osteochondritis dissecans, a bone and cartilage condition. He was subsequently declared at a Grade 5 health rating and became exempt from military duty as a result.

Filmography

Film

Television series

Web series

Television

Music video appearances

Musical theatre

Discography

Concerts

Ambassadorship

Achievements

Awards and nominations

References

External links

  
 
 
 

1987 births
Living people
21st-century South Korean singers
21st-century South Korean male actors
South Korean male singers
South Korean rhythm and blues singers
South Korean pop singers
South Korean hapkido practitioners
South Korean male idols
South Korean male film actors
South Korean male television actors
South Korean male musical theatre actors
People from Ulsan
Jellyfish Entertainment artists
Superstar K winners
MAMA Award winners
Melon Music Award winners